Judge Cain may refer to:

James D. Cain Jr. (born 1964), judge of the United States District Court for the Western District of Louisiana
Timothy M. Cain (born 1961), judge of the United States District Court for the District of South Carolina